Wyoming Highway 237 (WYO 237) is a  state road in Lincoln County, Wyoming that connects U.S. Route 89 (US 89) at Grover to WYO 238 and the community of Auburn.

Route description
Wyoming Highway 237 begins its western end at the intersection of W. 1st N St and S 1st W St in Auburn. WYO 237 travels east from there, intersecting Wyoming Highway 238 just 0.15 miles later. Past WYO 238, Highway 237 proceeds due east until it reaches its eastern end at US 89 in Grover at 3.42 miles.
The roadway continues northeast of Grover as Forest Service Road 10081 into Bridger-Teton National Forest and Turnerville.

Major intersections

References

Official 2003 State Highway Map of Wyoming

External links 

Wyoming State Routes
WYO 237 - US-89 to WYO 238
WYO 237 - WYO 238 to Auburn

Transportation in Lincoln County, Wyoming
237